The 2021 Birmingham Classic (also known as the Viking Classic Birmingham for sponsorship reasons) was a women's tennis tournament being played on outdoor grass courts. It was the 39th edition of the event, and a WTA 250 tournament on the 2021 WTA Tour. It took place at the Edgbaston Priory Club in Birmingham, United Kingdom, on 14–20 June 2021.

Champions

Singles

  Ons Jabeur def.  Daria Kasatkina, 7–5, 6–4

Doubles

  Marie Bouzková /  Lucie Hradecká def.  Ons Jabeur /  Ellen Perez 6–4, 2–6, [10–8]

Points and prize money

Point distribution

Prize money 

1Qualifiers prize money is also the round of 32 prize money.
*per team

Singles main draw entrants

Seeds

 1 Rankings are as of 31 May 2021.

Other entrants
The following players received wildcards into the main draw:
  Harriet Dart
  Francesca Jones
  Samantha Stosur

The following players received entry from the qualifying draw:
  Vitalia Diatchenko
  Giulia Gatto-Monticone
  Tereza Martincová
  Caty McNally
  CoCo Vandeweghe
  Wang Yafan

Withdrawals
Before the tournament
  Paula Badosa → replaced by  Nina Stojanović
  Coco Gauff → replaced by  Hsieh Su-wei
  Johanna Konta → replaced by  Camila Giorgi
  Anett Kontaveit → replaced by  Leylah Annie Fernandez
  Svetlana Kuznetsova → replaced by  Heather Watson
  Magda Linette → replaced by  Viktorija Golubic
  Anastasija Sevastova → replaced by  Marta Kostyuk
  Jil Teichmann → replaced by  Ajla Tomljanović
  Elena Vesnina → replaced by  Kristina Mladenovic
  Wang Qiang → replaced by  Polona Hercog
  Zheng Saisai → replaced by  Anastasia Potapova

Doubles main draw entrants

Seeds

1 Rankings are as of 31 May 2021.

Other entrants
The following pairs received wildcards into the doubles main draw:
  Naiktha Bains /  Tereza Martincová
  Sarah Beth Grey /  Emily Webley-Smith

Withdrawals
Before the tournament
  Dalila Jakupović /  Sabrina Santamaria → replaced by  Harriet Dart /  Heather Watson
  Magda Linette /  Alicja Rosolska → replaced by  Jeļena Ostapenko /  Alicja Rosolska
  Bethanie Mattek-Sands /  Sania Mirza → replaced by  Tara Moore /  Eden Silva

References

External links 
 

2021 WTA Tour
2021
2021 in English tennis
Birmingham Classic